Raúl R. Salinas (March 17, 1934 - February 13, 2008), better known by his pen name raúlrsalinas, was a Chicano pinto poet, memoirist, social activist, and prison journalist. Much of raúlrsalinas' writing was grounded in arguments for social justice and human rights. He was an early pioneer of Chicano pinto (prisoner) poetry and is notable for his use of vernacular, bilingual, and free verse aesthetics.

Alongside Ricardo Sánchez, Judy Lucero, Luis Talamantez, and Jimmy Santiago Baca, raúlrsalinas sought to make prisoners' rights a more central focus of the Chicano Movement. Incarcerated for over a decade (1959–1972) for carrying a small amount of marijuana, raúlrsalinas wrote extensively while in prison, including essays, letters, prose, and journalism, the vast majority which is now held at Stanford University. raúlrsalinas' work extended beyond his prison writing, focusing also on his Xicanindio (indigenous identified Chicano) heritage and his politics as a Latino internationalist. According to Oxford University, raúlrsalinas "transformed elements of the American literary canon."

Works
 Un Trip through the Mind Jail y Otras Excursions (Arte Publico Press, 1980). 
 East of the Freeway: Reflections De Mi Pueblo (Red Salmon Press, 1995). 
 Many Mundos Of Raulrsalinas: Un Poetic Jazz Viaje (Calaca Press, 2000). 
 Red Arc: A Call For Liberación Con Salsa Y Cool (Wings Press, 2005). 
 raú́lrsalinas and the Jail Machine: My Weapon is My Pen (University of Texas Press, 2006). 
 Indio Trails: A Xicano Odyssey Through Indian Country (Wings Press, 2006). 
 Memoir of Un Ser Humano: The Life and Times de Raúlrsalinas, edited by Louis G. Mendoza. (Red Salmon Press, 2018).

See also

List of Chicano poets
Pinto (subculture)

References

1934 births
2008 deaths
20th-century American poets
21st-century American poets
Activists for Hispanic and Latino American civil rights
American people of Mestizo descent
American poets of Mexican descent
Latin Americanists
Mestizo writers